Qalamlu (also Romanized as Qalamū) is a village in Keyvan Rural District, in the Central District of Khoda Afarin County, East Azerbaijan Province, Iran. At the 2006 census, its population was 12, in 4 families. The village is populated by the Kurdish Mohammad Khanlu tribe.

References 

Populated places in Khoda Afarin County
Kurdish settlements in East Azerbaijan Province